Charlotte Famin (born 12 February 1973) is a French wheelchair tennis player who competes in international level events. She is a six-time French Open quarterfinalist and a 20-time French national wheelchair tennis champion.

Famin lost her left leg in a motorbike accident in 2008.

References

External links 
 
 

1973 births
Living people
People from Puteaux
Tennis players from Paris
Paralympic wheelchair tennis players of France
Wheelchair tennis players at the 2016 Summer Paralympics